Taner Öcal (born 26 March 1962) is a Turkish football manager.

References

1962 births
Living people
Turkish football managers
MKE Ankaragücü managers
Kardemir Karabükspor managers
People from Mardin